2009 Ventforet Kofu season

Competitions

Player statistics

Other pages
 J. League official site

Statistical information for the 2009   league.

Ventforet Kofu
Ventforet Kofu seasons